The Lent Bumps 2020 was a series of rowing races at Cambridge University from Tuesday 25 February 2020 to Saturday 29 February 2020.  The event was run as a bumps race and was the 127th set of races in the series of Lent Bumps which have been held annually in late February or early March since 1887.

The races were the last set of Bumps before the COVID-19 pandemic forced the cancellation of all Lent and May Bumps events in Cambridge until the Lent Bumps 2022 two years later.

Head of the River crews
  M1 bumped  on First Post Corner on day 1, reclaiming the headship that Caius M1 had won the previous year.

 Starting 4th on the river,  W1 bumped  W1 and  W1 on the first and second days respectively, before rowing over on the third day and bumping  W1 (who had taken headship from Newnham on the first day) on the fourth day to claim the headship that Newnham had held since the previous year.

Highest 2nd VIIIs

Links to races in other years

Bumps Charts

Below are the bumps charts for all 4 men's and all 4 women's divisions, with the men's event on the left and women's event on the right. The bumps chart shows the progress of every crew over all four days of the racing. To follow the progress of any particular crew, find the crew's name on the left side of the chart and follow the line to the end-of-the-week finishing position on the right of the chart.

This chart may not be displayed correctly if you are using a large font size on your browser. A simple way to check is to see that the first horizontal bold line, marking the boundary between divisions, lies between positions 17 and 18.

References 

2020 in rowing
Lent Bumps results
2020 in English sport